Stadtroda (Roda until 1925) is a town of 6,653 people (2017), located in Thuringia, Germany.  Stadtroda lies on the river Roda, a tributary of the Saale. The former municipalities Bollberg and Quirla were merged into Stadtroda in January 2019.

History
According to some sources, Faust was born in Roda in 1480.  The house where he was born was torn down and sold to Chicago in 1896, where it was going to be shown in the Germany-Hall of the World's Fair.  The fate of the house is unknown.

Within the German Empire (1871–1918), Roda was part of the Duchy of Saxe-Altenburg.

Mayors

Mayors since 1886

Notable people

 Princess Louise of Saxe-Gotha-Altenburg (1756–1808), Princess of Sachsen-Gotha, Duchess of Mecklenburg-Schwerin, wife of the regent in the same place
 Paul Leopold Friedrich (1864–1916), surgeon
 Joachim Erwin (1949–2008), jurist and CDU politician, mayor of Düsseldorf 1999–2008

References

Towns in Thuringia
Saale-Holzland-Kreis
Duchy of Saxe-Altenburg